Schuyler Wentworth Horton (October 16, 1885 – October 2, 1960) was an American businessman and politician from New York.

Life
He was born on October 16, 1885, in Greenport, Suffolk County, New York. He attended Greenport High School and Syracuse University. He was a funeral director. He married Martha Mattice (1901–1984), and they had two sons: David Barnabas Horton (1932–2010) and Stewart Horton.

Horton was a member of the New York State Senate (1st D.) from January 1, 1947 to December 31, 1956, sitting in the 166th, 167th, 168th, 169th and 170th New York State Legislatures.

He was an alternate delegate to the 1948 Republican National Convention.

He died on October 2, 1960, in the South Shore Convalescent Home in Patchogue, New York; and was buried at the Central Cemetery in Orient.

Sources

External links
 

1885 births
1960 deaths
People from Greenport, Suffolk County, New York
Republican Party New York (state) state senators
Syracuse University alumni
People from Patchogue, New York
20th-century American politicians